Krazy Ace Miniature Golf is a 1993 miniature golf video game developed and published by Telegames in North America and Europe exclusively for the Atari Lynx.

Gameplay 

The player starts by putting in the name and selecting a color and is then thrown into a miniature golf course. When hitting the mini-golf ball it moves around the little course until it gets into a hole. Several stage/course obstacles include giant cactuses and a little pond are in the way.

Development and release 

Krazy Ace was programmed in 1991 but not released until late 1993 by Telegames. The game was released in very small quantities and as of a result of this, the game has become very sought-after by collectors and gamers alike. A complete copy today is worth around $450 making it one of the most expensive Atari Lynx titles ever officially released.

Reception 

Robert Jung reviewed the game which was published to IGN. In his final verdict he wrote "Krazy Ace Miniature Golf is a good miniature golf game, but not a great one; the card's major flaw is the lack of variety in the course and the game itself. With merely passable graphics and sound, this is a decent game to divert yourself for a little while, but there's almost nothing here to keep you on this krazy kourse for the long term." Giving a final score of 6 out of 10.

References

External links 
 Krazy Ace Miniature Golf at AtariAge
 Krazy Ace Miniature Golf at GameFAQs
 Krazy Ace Miniature Golf at MobyGames

1993 video games
Atari Lynx games
Atari Lynx-only games 
Miniature golf video games
Multiplayer and single-player video games
Telegames games
Video games developed in the United States